The women's 4 × 400 metres relay event at the 2019 European Athletics U23 Championships was held in Gävle, Sweden, at Gavlehov Stadium Park on 14 July.

Results

References

4 x 400 metres relay
Relays at the European Athletics U23 Championships